Whirlwind USA is a manufacturer of audio interfacing equipment and custom audio interfacing, including digital products that employ the EtherSound standard. In addition, Whirlwind manufactures guitar effects pedals. Whirlwind was founded in 1975 by Michael Laiacona (who cofounded MXR earlier that decade), and its headquarters are located in Rochester, New York.

Whirlwind's EtherSound product, e-Snake, has been the recipient of TEC Awards nominations for Outstanding Technical Achievement.

External links
Whirlwind USA
NAMM Oral History Interview with Michael Laiaoona May 1, 2013

References

Manufacturers of professional audio equipment
Audio equipment manufacturers of the United States